Jochen Horst (born 7 September 1961 in Osnabrück) is a German film, TV and theater actor.

Horst graduated in 1986 from the state Academy of Music and Performing Arts (Staatliche Hochschule für Musik und Darstellende Kunst) in Graz, Austria, summa cum laude. Subsequently, Horst went to London to attend the Lee Strasberg Institute for two years, furthering his studies of Method Acting.

Together with Anne Bennent, Horst received the O.-E.-Hasse-Preis in 1986 for Best Newcomer of the Year. For his leading role in German TV series Balko, Horst was awarded with the Grimme-Preis for Best Actor in 1996.

Horst lives in Spain with his family.

Filmography (selected) 
1988: Always Afternoon (TV Series) - Franz Muller
1991: Rothenbaumchaussee (TV Movie) - Hannes Hacker
1992:  - Ehemann
1992: The Cement Garden - Derek, Julie's Friend
1993: Swing Kids - Speaker at H.J. Rally
1995-1998: Balko (TV Series) - Kriminalhauptkommissar Stefan Balko / Cousin Werner
1998: Der Handymörder (TV Movie) - Dr. Victor Roth
1999: Die Blendung (TV Movie) - Daniel Rottländer
2001: Tatort (TV Series) - Peter Forster
2002: Die Westentaschenvenus (TV Movie) - Dr. Phillip Weiße
2002: Bella Block (TV Series) - Krambeck
2003: Luther - Professor Carlstadt
2004-2006: Typisch Sophie (TV Series) - Jo Hennecke
2005: Nero (TV Movie)
2008-2011: Die Stein (TV Series) - Stefan Hagen
2015-2016: Rote Rosen (TV Series) - Arthur Burgstett

External links

1961 births
Living people
German male film actors
German male television actors
German male stage actors
20th-century German male actors
21st-century German male actors